Chuang Chia-jung and Hsieh Su-wei were the defending champion, but Hsieh chose not to participate that year. Chuang partnered with Yan Zi, but they lost in the semifinals against Chan Yung-jan and Abigail Spears.Chan Yung-jan and Abigail Spears won in the final 6–3, 6–4 against Carly Gullickson and Nicole Kriz.

Seeds

  Anna-Lena Grönefeld /  Katarina Srebotnik (quarterfinals, Srebotnik withdrew due to right shoulder injury)
  Chia-Jung Chuang /  Yan Zi (semifinals)
  Alisa Kleybanova /  Ekaterina Makarova (semifinals)
  Klaudia Jans /  Alicja Rosolska (quarterfinals)

Draw

Draw

External links
 Main Draw

Korea Open (tennis)
Hansol Korea Open